Saamy 2, Also known as Saamy Square, is a 2018 Indian Tamil-language action film written and directed by Hari and produced by Shibu Thameens. It stars Vikram in a double role as a father and son, with Keerthy Suresh and Aishwarya Rajesh as the female leads alongside Bobby Simha,Prabhu, and Soori in supporting roles.

The film is a sequel to the 2003 film Saamy. The film was released theatrically on 21 September 2018. Saamy 2 received mixed reviews from critics, by criticizing the outdated story, humor, screenplay, music, and lack of standards compared to its first part. However, the film's cast performance (particularly Vikram) received praise.

Plot
Deputy commissioner Aarusaamy, who had been transferred out of Tirunelveli after finishing off evil politician Perumal Pichai, leads a happy life with his now-pregnant wife Bhuvana in Palani, who intends to pursue IAS. However, in Tirunelveli, Perumal Pichai's men, who were discussing what happened to him, assume that he might be in Colombo with Perumal Pichai's wife and three sons: Mahendra Pichai, the eldest; Devendra Pichai, the second-eldest; and Raavana Pichai, the youngest. Among them, Raavana is more dangerous and ruthless than Devendra and Mahendra. 28 years later, Aarusaamy's son Ramasaamy  lives in New Delhi and works under the Union Home Minister, Viswanathan. The Minister's daughter, Diya, who has returned from London after completing her studies and who constantly disagrees with him.

Later, when Raavana asks Viswanathan for the pending commission amount to be paid for transferring the party fund secretly, he simply replies to ask the party directly and not him. Irritated, Raavana kidnaps Diya for immediate settlement of payment. Ram rescues her from Raavana's goons and drops her home. She is impressed by his diplomatic nature and falls in love with him. Soon after, Ram accidentally happens to seize a van containing black money being transferred by Raavana on a commission basis. He hands the money over to the President of India without revealing his identity, which once again frustrates Raavana. Diya constantly proposes to Ram, which he rejects initially but gives in later.

Ram succeeds in the UPSC exam and leaves for Mussoorie for one-year training. After his return, his maternal grandparents are shell shocked to see that he has opted for IPS and that he has been posted as probationary Assistant commissioner in Tirunelveli. When Ram asks the reason for their reaction, his grandfather tells the truth that, in fact, his father, Aarusaamy, has been a Deputy commissioner in Tirunelveli. Ram's maternal grandfather begins to explain what happened 28 years ago. When Saamy and Bhuvana were on their way to Tirunelveli, they were hacked to death by the Pichai brothers to avenge their father's death. Before dying, Saamy manages to open his dead wife's uterus and prematurely deliver his child (Ram). Bhuvana's parents take Ram and escape to Delhi, while the rest of their family is killed by a truck accident planned by Raavana.

Agitated by hearing his tragic past, Ram decides to go to Tirunelveli and get justice for his parents' death. Ram's maternal grandparents accept his decision, and he leaves for Tirunelveli and decides to take on the Pichai brothers. He initially warns Raavana and vows to bring the Pichai brothers before the law for killing his parents. Ram later razes Perumal's statue, which had been illegally placed at an intersection by Raavana and caused a lot of traffic problems. A cat-and-mouse game ensues between Ram and Raavana, with both of them trying to get rid of each other. Per the president's orders, Sammy is transferred to Tirunelveli and by this, Raavan gets surprised as they were not able to make a transfer elsewhere. Meanwhile, Viswanathan initially disapproves of Ram and Diya's love, but he later accepts it.

Ram kills Devendra and Mahendra after an accident caused by them in Devendra's cracker factory to prevent Ram from seizing illegal extortion money of Raavana, which kills many innocent workers, as well as pregnant women. Raavana's goons start to kill the people of Tirunelveli in revenge. Viswanathan makes a decision to resign from politics for embarrassment faced. In the mean while, Raavana's henchmen orchestrate a train accident which kills Viswanathan.

Later, Raavana absconds to Colombo with his mother's advice.

Ram finds out that Raavana is planning to go to Pakistan via Gujarat and Rajasthan, he tracks him down. After a tiresome fight with desert bandits and Raavana, Ram subdues Raavana but decides to leave him to his fate in the middle of the Thar Desert with no man, town, village, or water source for several hundreds of kilometres.

As the credits roll, Ram lies to the media that Raavana had left for Sri Lanka due to fear of being killed. There is a record of Raavana, going to Sri Lanka, but there is no record of coming back to India. Whereas, Raavana dies after 17 days in the desert. Soon, Ram and Diya marry. The movie ends with the message, "Saamy's adventure will continue".

Cast

Production

Development 
In August 2016, during the audio launch of Iru Mugan, director Hari made an official announcement that he would unite with Vikram, also echoed by the latter, for a sequel to Saamy after 13 years being bankrolled by Shibu Thameens. The principal photography was expected to commence in late 2016 with Harris Jayaraj as music composer. During December 2016, Shibu Thameens confirmed that the plan for sequel was still on, putting an end to the rumours of the project being shelved, as director Hari and his team were involved in script development and would tentatively commence the principal photography in April 2017. In May 2017, it was officially announced that Devi Sri Prasad would be the composer, collaborating again with Vikram for the second time after Kanthasamy and Hari for the fifth time after Aaru, Venghai, Singam and Singam 2. In August 2017, it was reported that lyricist Viveka had joined the composer and director for a music composition session at Puducherry. Kanal Kannan and Silva were tasked with action choreography. Priyan, Hari's regular cinematographer, was selected as well, but later Venkatesh Anguraj became the cinematographer after Priyan died due to a heart attack in November 2017. The art direction was done by P. Shanmugam and P.V. Balaji, replacing K. Kadhir, who had collaborated with Hari in his previous films.

Casting 
Apart from Vikram reprising his role, Keerthy Suresh was selected as the female lead. Prabhu and comedian Soori were added to cast along with Bobby Simha. Trisha was originally going to reprise her role as Bhuvana from the first film, but opted out citing "creative differences"; she was replaced by Aishwarya Rajesh.

Filming 
Despite the commencement of pre-production, the shooting was supposed to be commenced during June or July 2017 as quoted by the film producer. Various sources towards reported that the shoot would start towards the end of September 2017. Finally, the principal photography commenced in Chennai from 30 September 2017 onwards. The director also revealed that the film would be shot in Delhi, Mussoorie and Nepal after shooting considerable portions in Chennai. In early October, the film's new title was revealed to be Saamy Square. Most of the scenes were shot at various locations within the city of Trivandrum and also in Karaikudi by setting the name of Thirunelveli.

Release and reception 

Saamy 2 received mixed reviews from critics, by criticizing the outdated story, humours, screenplay, music and lack of standard comparing to its first part. However, the film's cast performance received praise. The film was flagged as a "box-office bomb". The satellite rights of the film were sold to STAR Vijay. The film was later dubbed and released in Hindi by Pen Movies directly on TV channel Zee Cinema on 10 November 2019.

Indiaglitz called the movie A Speedy journeys to Nowhere in their review. They added, "Go for this ride if you are a fan of Vikram and are immune to Deja Vu".

Soundtrack 

The music was composed by Devi Sri Prasad, who replaces the predecessor's music composer Harris Jayaraj. This film marks the Tamil comeback of music composer Devi Sri Prasad after a hiatus of three years, whose previous Tamil film was Puli (2015).

Sony Music acquired the rights of the soundtrack for the film. All lyrics were written by Viveka, except one song, which was penned by the composer himself.

The first single, "Adhiroobaney," was released on 10 July 2018, with lyrics being penned by Viveka and sung by M. M. Manasi. The second single, "Molaga Podiye," soon followed and released on 18 July 2018. The full soundtrack album of the Tamil version was released on 23 July 2018.

Track listing

References

External links 
 
 

Films directed by Hari (director)
Fictional portrayals of the Tamil Nadu Police
Indian police films
Indian action films
2018 masala films
Films scored by Devi Sri Prasad
Indian sequel films
2010s Tamil-language films
2018 films
Films set in Tiruchirappalli
Films set in Delhi
Films set in Sri Lanka (1948–present)
Films set in Rajasthan
Films shot in Rajasthan
Films shot in Chennai
Films set in Chennai
Films shot in Thiruvananthapuram
Films shot in Karaikudi
Films shot in Uttarakhand
Films set in Uttarakhand
Films shot in Nepal
2018 action films
2010s police films